Coronation Street is a British soap opera, produced by ITV Studios. Created by writer Tony Warren, Coronation Street was first broadcast on ITV on 9 December 1960. It has been produced by Phil Collinson since 2010. The following is a list of characters introduced by Collinson in the show's fifty-first year, by order of first appearance. January saw three introductions; DC Moore (Pooja Shah), the detective in charge of the investigation into the attack on Tracy Barlow (Kate Ford), Marc Selby (Andrew Hall), a new love interest for both Audrey Roberts (Sue Nicholls) and Claudia Colby (Rula Lenska), and Frank Foster, played by former The Bill actor Andrew Lancel, as a new business partner for Carla Connor (Alison King). Faye Butler (Ellie Leach), the adoptive daughter of Anna (Debbie Rush) and Eddie Windass (Steve Huison), Jeff Cullen (Steven Houghton), a love interest for Sally Webster (Sally Dynevor), and the soap's first Chinese character, Xin Chiang (Elizabeth Tan), a friend of Tina McIntyre (Michelle Keegan), arrived in February. Veteran actress Stephanie Cole joined as Sylvia Goodwin, the mother of established character Roy Cropper (David Neilson), in April.

June saw a new family take over the running of the Rovers Return for the first time as former EastEnders actress Michelle Collins and Taggart actor John Michie took on the roles of Stella Price and Karl Munro respectively. The couple were also joined by Stella's daughter Eva (Catherine Tyldesley). A potential new love interest for Steve McDonald (Simon Gregson), Beth Tinker (Lisa George), and her son Craig (Colson Smith) arrived in August and Frank's parents, Anne (Gwen Taylor) and Sam Foster (Paul Clayton), made their first appearances in September, along with Kirsty Soames (Natalie Gumede), a new love interest for Tyrone Dobbs (Alan Halsall). Paul Kershaw's (Tony Hirst) Alzheimer's-suffering wife, Lesley Kershaw (Judy Holt), followed in October and Jeremy Sheffield began appearing as Danny Stratton, a new love interest for Becky McDonald (Katherine Kelly), in December. That same month saw the birth of Chesney Brown (Sam Aston) and Katy Armstrong's (Georgia May Foote) newborn son Joseph Brown, the only child to be born that year.

DC Moore

Detective Constable Moore, played by Pooja Shah, is a police officer investigating the attack on Tracy Barlow (Kate Ford) on New Year's Eve. Moore is first seen at the hospital speaking to Tracy's mother Deirdre (Anne Kirkbride) and stepfather Ken (William Roache) and questions them about a motive for the attack to which Deirdre implicates Steve McDonald (Simon Gregson). Moore and her colleague DC Redfern (Paul Warriner) go to The Rovers Return and question Steve about his whereabouts on the night of the attack. Steve gives them an account of his movements and denies being Tracy's attacker. They later question Nick Tilsley (Ben Price), Gail McIntyre (Helen Worth) and David Platt (Jack P. Shepherd) to see if they are involved. Moore and Redfern come across Norris Cole and Mary Taylor (Malcolm Hebden and Patti Clare) in the street and ask Norris for information. Norris implicates Becky McDonald (Katherine Kelly) as a potential suspect when he reveals that she and Tracy had a fight on Christmas Day in The Rovers. Following their new lead, Moore and Redfern pay the Rovers another visit and question Becky. Tracy accuses Becky, Becky is subsequently arrested for GBH and denies attacking Tracy. After Claire Peacock (Julia Haworth) confesses to the attack, Moore and Redfern release her on bail. The following night Moore and Redfern return to the Street to re-arrest Claire after making their enquiries. They fall for a decoy as residents help Claire escape.

Marc Selby

Marc Selby (also Marcia Selby), played by Andrew Hall, first appears as a customer at Claudia Colby's (Rula Lenska) salon. Marc befriends Audrey Roberts (Sue Nicholls) before her haircut and Claudia accuses Audrey of chatting him up. Claudia and Marc start dating, and Claudia shows him off in The Rovers Return Inn public house when she meets Audrey for drinks a few weeks later. In March, Claudia opens up to Audrey about her worries that Marc is hiding something after cancelling several dates, and the women decide to stake out Marc's house to see what he is doing while he is supposed to be out. Claudia fears the worst when they spot another woman leave the house. A few days later, Marc tells them that it was his sister leaving his house; but Claudia still doesn't believe him.

In April, Marc telephones Audrey from the police station asking her to pick him up. When Audrey arrives, she is shocked to not only find Marc brutally beaten up – but dressed as a woman. Back at Audrey's house, he confides in her that although he is heterosexual, as are the majority of cross-dressers, he has always felt the need to dress in women's clothes, under the alias Marcia, and that his late wife was supportive of his feelings. Audrey is very sympathetic but urges him to tell Claudia, for both their sakes. He remains reluctant.

Eventually, Marc is forced to reveal the truth to Claudia after she wrongly assumes that he is having an affair with Audrey. She doesn't take kindly to the confession and ends her relationship with Marc, disgusted by his cross-dressing. In August 2011, Kylie Platt (Paula Lane) and Eva Price (Catherine Tyldesley) spot Audrey with 'Marcia' and film them to use as blackmail against Audrey to get Kylie's job back at the salon. Despite Audrey telling Marc to keep quiet, he walks into The Rovers as Marcia leaving Audrey humiliated in front of daughter Gail (Helen Worth) and her friends. Marc makes his final appearance on 26 August 2011 after Audrey tells him that she can no longer cope with his cross-dressing.

Frank Foster

Francis John "Frank" Foster, played by Andrew Lancel, made his debut screen appearance on 20 January 2011. The character and casting was announced on 23 November 2010. Frank was introduced as a business associate of Carla Connor (Alison King). Of his casting, Lancel said "I'm made up to be here. It's been a long time coming and I'm a big fan of the show so I'm thrilled. Frank looks like he's going to be fun to play, there's more to him than meets the eye, he's definitely not one-sided." Describing Frank, Lancel commented that he is "charismatic, charming and you're never quite sure what he'll do next." Frank received a nomination for Best Baddy at the 2012 Virgin Media TV Awards. He received 1.39% of the vote. Jon Wise of The People called Frank an "evil bully".

Faye Windass

Faye Windass, played by Ellie Leach, made her first on screen appearance on 24 January 2011. The casting was announced in January 2011. Of her casting, her cousin, co-star Brooke Vincent, said "I am chuffed to bits for her. She has made me so happy. We are all thrilled about it and I can't wait to be with her on set to show her around." A show source added "Brooke was behind her all the way and was praying she would get the part – and after Ellie won the bosses over she couldn't contain herself. She was so pleased and happy for her. Ellie-Louise is made of the same stuff as Brooke, which means she'll fit in and get on well with everyone." Storylines involving Faye include being adopted by Anna (Debbie Rush) and Eddie Windass (Steve Huison), being hit by her mother's partner Owen Armstrong (Ian Puleston-Davies) in a controversial plot, being bullied herself and being peer pressured into bullying Simon Barlow (Alex Bain), contacting her birth father Tim Metcalfe (Joe Duttine) which ultimately leads to her falsely accusing Anna of abusing her and falling pregnant at the age of twelve and only letting best friend Craig Tinker (Colson Smith) know and struggling to cope with daughter Miley Windass (Erin, Eilah and Elsie Halliwell).

Jeff Cullen

Jeff Cullen, played by Steven Houghton, first appears on 7 February 2011 when he approaches Gail McIntyre (Helen Worth) and Sally Webster (Sally Dynevor) in the Rovers and offers to buy them a drink. Gail initially shows interest in Jeff, but it soon becomes clear that Jeff is attracted to Sally, so Gail leaves them and goes home. After Gail has left, Jeff takes Sally out for dinner. A few days later, Sally finds her daughter Rosie Webster (Helen Flanagan) upset after supposedly being sacked from her job as a promotions girl on refusing to go through with a glamour modelling shoot. Sally storms round to Rosie's agency to confront her boss 'Alfie', only to discover Jeff was 'Alfie'. Jeff explains to Sally that Rosie had lied about being sacked, and she had in fact resigned from her job. Jeff has since enjoyed several dates with Sally, often ending up in the middle of public spats between Sally and her "estranged" husband Kevin Webster (Michael Le Vell). In order to win points with Sally when he witnesses her giving half the £200,000 that Kevin won on a scratchcard in March, he offers a fortnight in Paris to Sally and winds Kev up about it. When he leaves for a bit, Sally apologises to Kevin for Jeff's attitude.

In May 2011, after a long weekend in Paris with Sally, Jeff proposes to her at the Bistro, she is shocked and tells him she is in no position to remarry after everything with Kevin. Later Jeff turns up at Number 4 where Kevin is staying while he recovers, Jeff accuses Sally of still having feelings for Kevin but an annoyed Sally tells him to stop being paranoid.

Jeff reappears several months later and rekindles his relationship with Sally, despite her having had a one-night stand with Kevin. However, Sophie (Brooke Vincent) and Rosie are unhappy because they want Sally to get back together with Kevin. Rosie devises a plan to split up Jeff and Sally: she dresses in revealing lingerie when Jeff calls to the house to see her about modelling work and deliberately spills a drink on his trousers. Just as she is trying to pull Jeff's trousers off, Sally walks through the door and immediately gets the impression that Jeff has been trying to seduce Rosie. Later, Rosie is forced to admit the truth and Sally reconciles with Jeff.

After Rosie is held hostage by John Stape (Graeme Hawley) in October 2011, Jeff encourages her to do an exclusive interview with The Weatherfield Gazette to further her modelling profile. However, unknownst to Rosie, Jeff provides the journalist with personal information about the private lives of the Webster family, including Sophie's sexuality, Sally breast cancer battle and Kevin's affair with Molly Dobbs (Vicky Binns). When the article appears, the family are humiliated and Sally orders Jeff to leave and never return.

Xin Proctor

Xin Proctor (née Chiang), played by Elizabeth Tan, is a friend of Tina McIntyre (Michelle Keegan) and is the first Chinese character to feature in a regular role on Coronation Street. She makes her first appearance on 14 February 2011, and departed the series on 13 June 2011.

Development
Former Doctor Who actress Elizabeth Tan won the role of Xin and began filming on 10 January. Tan said of her casting: "I was very excited to be offered a role on Coronation Street because it's such an iconic show with such a lot of talented actors".

The UK Border Agency has praised Coronation Street for highlighting the issue of sham marriages in its latest storyline. Eddy Montgomery – North-West regional director of the UKBA – told the newspaper: "We are pleased to see the profile of our work raised and to see this sort of storyline being featured in the media. We have been really happy to work closely with Granada on this, as we have seen this cynical crime in action in the region."

Storylines
Xin is introduced as a 19-year-old waitress friend of Tina McIntyre's, who works at the Royal Panda restaurant. She is first mentioned by Tina on 11 February 2011 when Tina says that Xin got the job that she applied for at The Royal Panda. On Valentine's Day Graeme (Craig Gazey) and Tina go to the restaurant and meet Xin who is upset as she is getting very little pay and can not cope with all the bills she has to pay. They invite her to live with them, but after Dev Alahan finds out, he tells them if Xin moves in they will have to pay an extra £200, so Xin turns down the offer and leaves to go back to her flat.

She is next seen on 4 March 2011, when Graeme and Tina and David Platt (Jack P. Shepherd) go to the restaurant where she is working at, Xin tells them she is not allowed to talk to them after what happened last time so they then leave. Later that day Kylie Turner (Paula Lane) suggests that Xin marry a British citizen. So Tina and Graeme stage a break up so Xin can marry Graeme.

In March 2011, Xin and Graeme invite Emily Bishop (Eileen Derbyshire) and Norris Cole (Malcolm Hebden) for dinner and decorate the flat with Christmas decorations in order for people to believe they had a past and they then ask Norris and Emily to pose for a picture which they do. On 8 April 2011, Xin and Graeme are married before friends and neighbours, despite Norris's pledge to halt proceedings when he finds out about the sham. Tina persuades Norris to keep quiet until after the service, but she can't stop him from telling Rita Sullivan (Barbara Knox), who is hurt by Tina's lies but promises not to tell anyone their secret as long as no one asks. Norris, however, makes no such promise. A few weeks later, Graeme and Xin receive a letter through the post informing them they are due a visit from an immigration official. He arrives the next day and interviews the couple separately about each other and their time together.

As they spend more time together, an attraction begins to form between the married couple. In June, after a staged argument at Xin's leaving party becomes all too real, Xin and Graeme admit their feelings to each other, before kissing and sleeping together. A conflicted Graeme then tries to patch things up with Tina before asking Xin for a divorce. However Graeme could not fight his feelings for Xin and so he dumps Tina. Tina is angrily heartbroken and throws all of Xin and Graeme's things out on to the street. Xin and Graeme are then forced to stay at David's mother Gail's (Helen Worth) house, when David offers them to. Xin and Graeme prepare to move to London after Tina threatens to report them to the immigration authorities, however Tina forgives Graeme and tells him that she could never hate him, and watches as the couple leave the street in a cab.

Sylvia Goodwin

Sylvia Goodwin (also Cropper and Mitchell), played by Stephanie Cole, made her first on-screen appearance on 11 April 2011. Sylvia is the mother of Roy Cropper (David Neilson) and arrives on the street to visit Roy and his wife Hayley. She is a very outspoken and confrontational woman. Julie Hesmondhalgh, who plays Sylvia's daughter-in-law Hayley, admitted she was looking forward to the character's arrival. Further to earlier reports, Hesmondhalgh described Sylvia as "quite fierce". During an August 2012 interview with Digital Spy's Daniel Kilkelly, series producer Phil Collinson revealed that Cole had taken a break from the soap due to an illness. He added that she would return the following year when she had made a full recovery. For her portrayal of Sylvia, Cole won the "Best Comedy Performance" at The British Soap Awards 2012.

On 2 August 2013, it was confirmed that Cole had left Coronation Street and filmed her character's departure scenes. Sylvia left on 2 August as part of Hayley's pancreatic cancer storyline.

Roy receives a letter from Sylvia informing him that his stepfather has died. Roy tells Hayley that he did not care for the man and is not going to attend the funeral. Sylvia arrives in April on the day of the funeral to ask Roy why he did not attend, even to support his mother. She is shocked to learn that Roy is now married. After Hayley discovers that Sylvia has been living in a run-down nursing home she tells Roy, who eventually offers her to live with them and also offers her a job in the café. Roy is not pleased with the idea of Sylvia looking after the café while he and Hayley go on holiday at first, but he later changes his mind. Sylvia finds Becky McDonald in the café, after she walks out on Steve. Sylvia goes to The Rovers Return public house to get Steve McDonald (Simon Gregson) to remove Becky from the café, but Becky refuses to forgive Steve. Sylvia urges Becky to return home as she is lucky to have a husband like Steve but this also fails. Sylvia is devastated to find out that Roy's wife, Hayley, is a transsexual and she finds it hard to deal with and decides to disown Roy and Hayley, but after Roy tells some home truths to his mother, Sylvia finally comes round, apologising to both Roy and Hayley for her behaviour.

Hayley books a holiday for herself and Roy, but he is uncertain about leaving the café with his mother, who tells him to relax because she has got Anna Windass (Debbie Rush) to help her. While Roy and Hayley are away, Sylvia introduces a new regime into the café by setting prices on condiments like milk, sugar and tomato sauce and even charging to use the café toilet and giving customers smaller portions on their plates. This upsets the likes of Owen Armstrong (Ian Puleston-Davies), Norris Cole (Malcolm Hebden), Karl Munro (John Michie) and Emily Bishop (Eileen Derbyshire). Eventually, Norris decides to ruin Sylvia's money-making ideas by staying in the café after it closes making Sylvia serve him, when Norris needs the toilet, Sylvia decides to lock him in the lavatory, leaving Norris for the night. When Emily goes into The Kabin to inform Rita Sullivan (Barbara Knox) and Mary Taylor (Patti Clare) that Norris has not slept in his bed, they go to look for him, but cannot find him. Sylvia decides to let Norris out before she opens the café, Norris then rushes to the Rovers where he finds Rita, Mary, Emily and Dennis Tanner (Philip Lowrie), and tells them what has happened and they storm around to the café where they tell Roy what has happened, Roy cannot apologise enough and tells them that Mary, Norris, Dennis and Emily are welcome to a free meal after closing time with Sylvia acting as their waitress, much to her annoyance.

Sylvia realises that Anna has fallen for Owen and tells Owen to look after Anna because she has a heart of gold. Becky goes to the café to tell Hayley that Steve and Tracy Barlow (Kate Ford) are having twins, Becky breaks down in Hayley's arms and Sylvia also comforts Becky, with Sylvia telling her that Steve is stupid and has made the wrong decision, Becky then hugs Sylvia and Hayley and telling them how much they mean to her. Sylvia goes on a cruise after winning a competition by stealing Mary's slogan. Upon her return, Sylvia reveals she had a romance with Milton Fanshaw (Robert Vaughn). Sylvia regularly calls Milton, until Roy blocks the number as it was costing him too much. Milton turns up in Weatherfield to see Sylvia. Milton tries to buy the shop next door to Roy's, formerly owned by Ashley Peacock (Steven Arnold) until he was killed in the tram crash in December 2010. Milton plans to knock down the wall and extend Roy's Rolls, Sylvia is happy about the plan but Roy isn't and puts a stop to it, prompting Sylvia to say how disappointed she is in Roy. A couple of weeks, later Milton decides to leave Weatherfield and return to America; he asks Sylvia to move with him, and she agrees. Roy does not show his disappointment, even when it comes to the day Sylvia leaves for America, though Hayley tries to get him to ask her to stay; he refuses, telling Hayley he does not want to rule his mother's life. Sylvia later returns to the café, having decided to stay. When Sylvia hears that Milton has broken his leg, she decides to fly out to Palm Springs to visit him.

Sylvia returns to the street in February 2013 and tells Roy and Hayley that it is just a flying visit, however a trunk arrives at the cafe and a stunned Sylvia opens it up to find all of her things in it, she then phones Milton, who sent the trunk to the cafe, and he tells her that although they had fun, he doesn't want her to go back there because someone else is looking after him, so Sylvia returns to working in the cafe. She then starts acting strangely and starts going out without telling Roy where she is going, Hayley assumes that she has got another man but Roy thinks otherwise, so he follows her and is surprised when she enters a casino, he learns of her gambling problems. Later on he discovers that she has lost £2,000 at the casino, so he tells her he will get it back, so Roy, Sylvia, Dennis and Ken Barlow (William Roache) head to the casino and using his mathematical skills, Roy wins back the £2,000, however, back at the cafe, she and Roy argue about more gambling and Roy walks out, upon his return Sylvia apologises and Roy gives her back her watch from the pawnbrokers.

In July 2013, when Hayley is first diagnosed with pancreatic cancer, Sylvia supports Hayley and encourages her to tell Roy, who at first is not aware of his wife's illness. Roy and Hayley then decide to go on holiday, travelling the country. While away, Sylvia chooses to leave Weatherfield and go and stay with her sister Jean in Hastings, leaving a note for Anna to find. Upon their return, Roy is furious at his mother's selfishness but Hayley encourages Roy not to be angry, saying that at a time of sadness, some people choose to look the other way rather than help.

After Hayley dies in January 2014 Roy leaves a note saying he is going to visit Sylvia and Jean. However, Fiz Stape (Jennie McAlpine) discovers that Roy did not go to Jean's and that Sylvia, currently holidaying in Tenerife, has had no contact with Roy since leaving Weatherfield. In January 2016, Sylvia falls and breaks both her wrists while dancing. About to visit her children in Australia and unable to take care of her, Jean calls Roy and asks him to look after Sylvia. Roy is initially reluctant but Cathy encourages him to make peace with his mother, eventually he agrees and goes down to Hastings to look after her. In January 2019, Roy goes to visit Sylvia in Hastings, only to find she had died before his arrival. Roy later learns that Sylvia had an affair with a man named Raymond Parrott, and had fallen pregnant and subsequently given the child up for adoption. Roy then decides to look for his half-brother Richard Lucas (Paul Bown) and newfound niece, Sylvia's granddaughter Nina Lucas (Mollie Gallagher).

Stella Price

Stella Price (also Munro), played by Michelle Collins, made her debut screen appearance on 16 June 2011. The character and casting was announced on 15 April 2011. Stella was introduced as the new landlady of The Rovers Return Inn public house alongside her partner Karl Munro (John Michie) and daughter Eva Price (Catherine Tyldesley). Of her casting, Collins said  "I am honoured to be joining the cast of Coronation Street. The show has been part of my life since I was a child so to become a part of it is extremely exciting." Stella is described as a "confident sort of woman" who is strong, feisty and funny. Upon Collins debut in Coronation Street, viewers criticised her northern accent. However, Coronation Street producer, Phil Collinson defended Collins commenting "I think the landlady of the Rovers Return would have to be a Northern character, really, I don't think we could have had a Southerner running the pub." Cast, including Kym Marsh (who plays Michelle Connor) and Antony Cotton (who plays Sean Tully), also defended Collins.

Karl Munro

Karl Munro first appeared on 17 June 2011 when he moves into The Rovers Return Inn with his girlfriend, Stella (Michelle Collins) and her daughter, Eva (Catherine Tyldesley). In 2012, Karl embarked on an affair with Sunita Alahan (Shobna Gulati) after he struggled with his gambling addiction. Stella,  Eva and her other daughter Leanne Battersby (Jane Danson) discovered Karl and Sunita half-naked in The Rovers one night so Stella slapped Sunita. In 2013, Karl began a vendetta against Stella and her new toy-boy Jason Grimshaw (Ryan Thomas), torching Jason's work van and trying to rape Stella. In March, Karl took things to the next level when he set fire to The  Rovers, trapping himself, Stella and Sunita. Local firefighter Toni Griffiths (Tara Moran) was killed instantly in the blaze, but Sunita later died in hospital, after Karl pulled her oxygen tube out. Stella then went on to marry Karl, but it was revealed that he torched The Rovers, killed Sunita and has been terrorizing young Craig Tinker (Colson Smith). He made his final appearance on 13 September 2013, after being arrested and holding Stella and Dev Alahan (Jimmi Harkishin) hostage.

Eva Price

Eva Price, played by Catherine Tyldesley, made her first on screen appearance on 17 June 2011. The character and casting was announced on 4 May 2011. During an interview with Digital Spy, Tyldesley revealed that there had been a lot of competition for the role of Eva and that she felt "incredibly lucky" to have secured the part. Eva is Stella Price's (Michelle Collins) daughter. She moved into the Rovers Return Inn with her mother and her mother's boyfriend, Karl (John Michie). Tyldesley described her character as being "a little bit of a princess. She's been spoiled rotten, so she's somewhat high maintenance and a little bit of a drama queen. She's definitely used to getting her own way." Kate White of Inside Soap praised the character, saying "Sexy, sassy and often a proper bitch, Eva's by far the most interesting girl in Weatherfield right now. She's got the makings of a classic Corrie woman. Think Karen, think Bet."

Beth Tinker

Beth Sutherland (also Tinker), played by Lisa George, made her first on screen appearance on 5 August 2011. The character and George's casting was announced on 4 August 2011. The actress told a writer for the Grimsby Telegraph that the role of Beth came up while she was touring nursing homes in Glasgow with her musical act. George said "I was delighted they asked me to audition for the role as I saw a lot of friendly faces again, who I have worked with before." George appeared in Coronation Street three times before her latest stint as Beth. Beth initially appears as Steve McDonald's (Simon Gregson) "nightmare date" for two episodes. On 10 October 2011, itv.com announced Beth would be returning to Coronation Street.

Craig Tinker

Craig Tinker, played by Colson Smith, made his first screen appearance on 5 August 2011. In August 2017, Smith and Lucy Fallon (Bethany Platt) were longlisted for Best Partnership at the Inside Soap Awards. They progressed to the shortlist, but lost out to Nicole Barber-Lane and Lysette Anthony, who portray Myra McQueen and Marnie Nightingale in Hollyoaks.

Craig is Beth Tinker's (Lisa George) teenage son. He accompanies his mother to her date with Steve McDonald (Simon Gregson) at the Bistro, where the trio are thrown out. Craig and Beth later move into 13 Coronation Street with Tracy Barlow (Kate Ford). Craig brings his pet rat Darryl with him, which Tracy dislikes. A few months later, Beth, Craig and Tracy are evicted. Beth and Craig move into the flat above Barlow's Bookies, but when Beth begins dating Kirk Sutherland (Andrew Whyment), they move in with him.

In 2013, Craig begins acting very strangely. He begins avoiding Beth and Kirk and soon reveals to Karl Munro (John Michie) that he had been at the back of The Rovers Return moments before it went up in flames. Craig says he'd thrown a cigarette away when Karl, who was the arsonist, came out, so Karl tries to reassure him that victim Sunita Alahan (Shobna Gulati) burned down the building. However, Craig plans to turn himself in so Karl tricks him into thinking that he had started the fire so nobody would find out his secret. Later, Craig begins to become depressed and Karl starts to take advantage of Craig, such as giving him his phone number and buying him treats. Beth confronts Karl, who says he did it as a one-off. Craig then bunks off school and eventually disappears. Jason Grimshaw (Ryan Thomas), Karl's enemy, and Dev Alahan (Jimmi Harkishin) start to become suspicious about Karl befriending Craig so suddenly. Karl tracks him down and threatens to kill him if he pulls any more stunts. When he is re-united with Beth and Kirk, Craig fabricates a cover story where he claims he is being bullied by schoolmates Dean McGinley (Jordan Rosindale) and Connor Hayton (Bailey Pearson), resulting in them being suspended. The 'bullies' then corner and threaten Craig, but Karl witnesses this and explodes with anger, increasing more suspicion. When Dev tries to talk to Craig, Beth intervenes as she assumes they're in trouble with Dev for shoplifting. After Beth forces Craig into telling her, Kirk, Jason and Dev what's wrong, Craig finally tells Jason, Dev, Beth and Kirk about the incident. The five then work together to bring Karl down, with Dev going to the registry office where Stella Price (Michelle Collins) and Karl plan to marry stop them, while the others go to the police station to make a statement. Despite Dev failing to stop the wedding, Karl is arrested after kidnapping Dev and Stella. Craig avoids Stella when she tries to apologise for everything Karl put him through.

Craig discovers that Faye Windass (Ellie Leach) is being bullied at school and he supports her, as he has been bullied previously for being overweight. Craig looks on-line to discover the reasons for Faye's weight gain and he realizes that she may be pregnant. Faye takes a pregnancy test and it confirms that she is pregnant, which she becomes upset and terrified; however, Craig is willing Faye to support her.

In April 2015, Faye goes into labour and she pleads for her mum to be with her. Craig finds Anna and Owen and he alerts them that Faye is in trouble. Faye is taken to hospital, where she gives birth to a baby girl. Craig is questioned by his mother about the possibility of him being the father of Faye's baby. Craig promises that he is not the father and he was only supporting her through the final months of her pregnancy because he is one of Faye's closest friends. After attempting to attack Craig, following the accusations of him being the father of Faye's baby and hitting Kirk in the process, Owen is reported and arrested for assault. In June 2015 Craig starts acting weird and creeping out of the house at night. Beth starts to suspect that he is a drug addict, however when she searches his bag she found spray paints. Craig shows Beth and Kirk that he has been painting a memorial, for Maddie Heath (Amy James-Kelly), who died in the Victoria Court fire. He later admits to painting on Sally Webster's (Sally Dynevor) wall. Beth and Kirk cheer him on. In August, Craig goes on a camping trip with Beth, Kirk, Sinead, Fiz, Tyrone, wilderness explorer Dougie Ryan, and Dougie's daughter Caitlin, who falls in love with him. They begin dating once Caitlin arrives in Weatherfield but she later decides to end their relationship so that she can study at university.

In 2016, Craig has an attack of cowardice during a failed robbery, in which Kylie Platt (Paula Lane) is stabbed and killed but later redeems himself by showing great courage when Gemma Winter (Dolly-Rose Campbell) is threatened. This inspires him to apply to become a Special Constable but he is turned down on account of his having a criminal father. This is news to Craig, who is angry that Beth never told him. Faye writes to Craig's father, Darryl Perkins (Paul Loughran), who subsequently contacts Craig asking him to visit him in prison. Despite Beth's objections Craig goes to the prison, but is dismayed to find that his father only wanted him to supply him with drugs. He also tells Craig that he is still married to Beth and that her marriage to Kirk is therefore invalid. Still angry with his mother, Craig reports her to the police for bigamy. In 2017 Craig, now a Special Constable (the decision to disqualify him having been overturned), comes under the mentorship of Neil Clifton (Ben Cartwright) who is unbeknownst to him an accomplice of child sex trafficker, Nathan Curtis (Christopher Harper). When Bethany Platt (Lucy Fallon) confides in Craig that Neil raped her, he confronts him and is threatened. Fortunately, Craig contrives to record Neil's threats, and the latter is arrested. Though thankful for the evidence he provided, Craig's superiors give him a formal warning for "breaking the rules".

In 2018, Craig starts flicking switches and turning knobs repeatedly. He goes to the doctor and it is revealed that he has OCD .

Sam Foster

Sam Foster, played by Paul Clayton, made his first on screen appearance on 4 September 2011. The character and casting was announced on 4 August 2011. Clayton previously appeared in Coronation Street as Mal Quillan in 2005. Sam is married to Anne (Gwen Taylor) and is the father of Frank (Andrew Lancel). Of Sam and his wife, a show spokesperson said "Sam and Anne are pretty full -on characters, like Frank. No sooner have they arrived than they're talking grandchildren which instantly freaks Carla out and tensions soon rise."

Sam and his wife arrive in Coronation Street from France to celebrate Frank's engagement to Carla Connor (Alison King). Following a car accident involving Frank and Carla, Sam goes to the hospital with Anne. Sam is disappointed with Frank after he admits to crashing the car, not Carla. Frank later tells his parents the wedding is off, as Carla has ended their relationship. When Carla accuses Frank of raping her, Sam and Anne appear at his court hearing. Sam is forced to hold his wife back, when she shouts abuse at Carla. The following year, Sam has a heart attack and dies.

Anne Foster

Anne Foster, played by Gwen Taylor, made her first on screen appearance on 4 September 2011. The character and casting was announced on 4 August 2011. Taylor revealed she had found her first day on set "terrifying", but she quickly settled in. Anne is married to Sam (Paul Clayton) and is the mother of Frank (Andrew Lancel). Of Sam and his wife, a show spokesperson said "Sam and Anne are pretty full -on characters, like Frank. No sooner have they arrived than they're talking grandchildren which instantly freaks Carla out and tensions soon rise." A reporter for the Western Mail branded Anne a "pompous matriarch".

Kirsty Soames

Kirsty Soames, played by Natalie Gumede, made her first on screen appearance on 7 September 2011. Kirsty was introduced as a love interest for Tyrone Dobbs (Alan Halsall). While interviewed on This Morning series producer Phil Collinson said that Kirsty's arrival marked the start of a "big storyline" for Tyrone. He added that Tyrone's involvement with Kirsty would not be a "smooth ride". On being cast in the soap, Gumede stated "From the moment I read the script, I knew I was going to love playing Kirsty and I can't wait to see how the story unfolds." For her portrayal of Kirsty, Gumede won Best Newcomer at the 2012 British Soap Awards.

Lesley Kershaw

Lesley Kershaw, played by Judy Holt, made her first screen appearance during the episode broadcast on 17 October 2011. Lesley is married to Paul Kershaw (Tony Hirst). She made her last appearance on 11 May 2012.

Lesley's husband, Paul, starts dating Eileen Grimshaw (Sue Cleaver) and the two women are initially unaware of each other until Marcus Dent (Charlie Condou) tells Eileen that he saw Paul with a woman in the supermarket. Eileen confronts Paul and he explains that Lesley has Alzheimer's disease, and Paul finds it hard to cope. They agree to be friends so when Lesley starts to act violently, Paul confides in Eileen and Lesley goes missing soon afterwards but Eileen finds her. Eileen invites Paul and Lesley for a Christmas drink, but Lesley becomes increasingly confused and continuously asks to go home. In January, Eileen agrees to look after Lesley while Paul works. Lesley talks to Marcus and seems to take a liking to him but when alone with Eileen, Lesley becomes irritated and turns on the television with high volume. She constantly asks where Paul is and then tries to leave Eileen's house. When Eileen stops her, Lesley becomes erratic and starts destroying things. Eileen calls Paul and he comes to collect her and offers to pay for the damage but Eileen refuses. Eileen goes to visit Paul that night and he explains that he has booked a one-night stay at a home for Lesley for his own good. Eileen agrees with him and says he needs a break.

Paul's house is flooded due to faulty water mains so Eileen invites Lesley and Paul to stay with her, angering her son, Jason (Ryan Thomas). Lesley spots Amy Barlow (Elle Mulvaney) blowing bubbles outside and they go to the park. Steve McDonald (Simon Gregson) finds them and brings them home, where Tracy Barlow (Kate Ford) shouts at Lesley for going off with her daughter so Paul puts Lesley in a care home. Lesley later leaves the care home and goes home but Paul collects her and brings her back to Eileen's. Lesley refuses to return to the care home and when Paul tries to force her into his car, she slips and sprains her wrist. She later calls the police claiming Eileen is hurting her, but the policeman leaves when Paul and Eileen explain that Lesley is ill. While she is being looked after by Eileen, Lesley becomes agitated and punches her. Eileen leaves her alone and Lesley tries to make herself cheese on toast. However, she picks up the toaster and drops it in the sink, electrocuting herself. Eileen finds Lesley on the kitchen floor and she is pronounced dead by the paramedics.

Danny Stratton

Danny Stratton, played by Jeremy Sheffield, made his first on screen appearance on 16 December 2011. The character and Sheffield's casting was announced on 14 October 2011. The official Coronation Street website at itv.com said Danny would be introduced as a potential love interest for Becky McDonald (Katherine Kelly), who is trying to forge a new life without her ex-husband. Of Sheffield's casting, producer Phil Collinson said "I'm delighted to be welcoming Jeremy to the cast. Danny will be integral to the unmissable final chapter of the Steve/Becky/Tracy love triangle. It's thrilling that such a key character will be in the hands of such a fine actor." Sheffield began filming his first scenes as Danny on 24 November 2011. The actor admitted to being nervous when he first started filming, but he said having friends in the cast really helped. Danny departed on 23 January 2012.

Danny first encounters Becky when she and her ex-husband, Steve McDonald (Simon Gregson) set up a meeting with him to discuss a potential contract between his hotel and their taxi firm. Danny sets his sights on Becky and arranges a date with her. However, he is left disappointed when she cancels it after a run in with Steve. Sheffield said Danny is very understanding after Becky cancels their date as he knows she is caught up in the situation with Steve. Danny is patient and decides to wait for Becky because he feels strongly for her. Of Danny's attraction to Becky, Sheffield told Katy Moon of Inside Soap "Danny and Becky are from completely different backgrounds – they're like chalk and cheese, yet they find those differences exciting. There's a lot of humour between them too. Danny finds her quirky and quite funny, and he delights in that."

Becky later goes to see Danny, but is shocked when she sees him with another woman and a young boy who calls him 'Dad'. Sheffield revealed his character is a widower whose wife died four years ago. The young boy is his son, Billy (Wade Sayers), and the woman is his sister. Becky goes to leave and Danny catches up with her and explains the situation. Sheffield explained Danny has been through tragedy and although he has met many women since his wife's death, he has not found The One. A lot of the women he has met have had problems with him being a single father, which is why he did not tell Becky about Billy sooner. Sheffield added Danny has a feeling he can introduce Becky to Billy and it will be okay. The actor said "Danny's delighted by her reaction and her instant connection to his son. It only adds to his attraction to her." Danny reveals to Becky that he is being transferred to Barbados and he has decided to go. Sheffield told Sally Brockway of Soaplife that Danny thinks the transfer is a great opportunity, but it is really bad timing. He is torn about whether to stay or go because of Becky. Sheffield said "He's devastated because he saw it as a chance of happiness of the sort that doesn't come along very often." Danny decides to ask Becky to come with him.

Joseph Brown

Joseph Brown, played by Lucca-Owen Warwick from December 2011 to March 2015, and William Flanagan since October 2017, made his first on screen appearance on 23 December 2011. Joseph is the son of Chesney Brown (Sam Aston) and Katy Armstrong (Georgia May Foote). Flanagan is the twin brother of Isabella Flanagan, who plays Joseph's cousin Hope Stape. Flanagan's other sister, Amelia Flanagan, plays April Windsor in Emmerdale.

Shortly after Chesney and Katy begin living together, Katy decides she wants a baby and falls pregnant. Her father, Owen Armstrong (Ian Puleston-Davies), is not pleased and suggests Katy have an abortion. Katy considers the idea when she thinks Chesney has left her, but chooses to keep her baby. In December 2011, Katy goes into labour while acting in the Christmas nativity play. Chesney is out delivering Christmas trees and rushes back to be with her. Anna Windass (Debbie Rush) and Chesney's sister Fiz Stape (Jenny McAlpine) help deliver the baby. Katy and Chesney name their son Joseph Peter but struggles to look after him. Katy leaves him alone when she realises she that she needs to go to the bank, but gets back in time to meet Chesney. In 2012, Katy asks Anna's adoptive daughter Faye Butler (Ellie Leach) to look after Joseph, while she goes out. Faye tries to cook herself some food and when she goes outside to empty the bin, she gets locked out and a fire starts. Owen breaks in and saves Joseph, telling Chesney that he will look after him. Katy doubts her parenting skills, but after talking to her sister Izzy Armstrong (Cherylee Houston), she and Chesney continue to raise Joseph together.

In 2013, Katy has an affair with Ryan Connor (Sol Heras). At first, he stays with Katy but starts visiting Chesney and his new girlfriend Sinead Tinker (Katie McGlynn) more frequently. When Katy ends her relationship with Ryan, she and Joseph move in with Owen and Anna. When Katy's mother, Linda Hancock (Jacqueline Leonard), returns out of the blue in early 2015, she asks Katy to live in Portugal with her. Despite initially refusing to let Joseph go, Chesney tells Katy that they should go for a better life. Joseph leaves with Katy to Portugal in March 2015. Chesney and Sinead visit Joseph in late 2015. In October 2017, Izzy receives a phonecall from Owen, revealing that Katy has been killed in a car accident in Portugal, and that Joseph is staying with Linda. Upon hearing of Katy's death, Chesney, who is in hospital recovering after collapsing, discharges himself and travels to Portugal to collect Joseph and bring him back to Weatherfield. Joseph struggles to settle in and reconnect with his father.

Foote was both shocked and excited when she heard her character would be giving birth near to Christmas time. Of filming the labour scenes, Foote told Daniel Kilkelly of Digital Spy "I was really nervous leading up to doing the scenes, and there was quite a long wait to do them. We filmed the storyline out of sequence, so I filmed quite a lot of scenes which take place after the baby arrives before I'd actually filmed the birth. But then the shoot for these scenes finally came up." The actress said it was strange, but she had support from Debbie Rush (who plays Anna Windass) and a midwife. Katy goes into labour while she is playing Mary in a nativity play and Foote said she is quite shocked when she realises the baby is coming. Katy is also scared because she is not giving birth in a hospital, which would be more comfortable for her. While Katy is giving birth, Chesney is trying to get to the community centre in time. In his absence, Anna helps support Katy. When asked if she was pleased with the baby's name, Joseph Peter, Foote said "I'm surprised it's not Jesus! They've obviously gone for the next best thing instead by choosing Joseph. It's a nice name, and then they've chosen Peter as a way of remembering Schmeichel the dog, so that's really nice too." Foote added she had found working with the baby who plays Joseph really good and she had had practice with a baby before when her character looked after Chesney's young niece.  Of his casting, Flanagan said he loves working on Coronation Street and acting with his sisters, with whom he learns the scripts with. Flanagan had an audition and a screen test before being offered the part. He stated that the cast and crew "are really fun to work with especially Sam who plays my Dad."

Others

References

External links

2011
, Coronation Street
2011 in British television